Conus sugillatus is a species of sea snail, a marine gastropod mollusk, in the family Conidae, the cone snails and their allies.

Distribution
This species occurs in the Mascarene Basin.

References

Conidae